Terrell Louis Ransom Jr. (born July 5, 2003), also known as Kid Prodigy, is an American actor. He is mostly known for his roles on The Amazing World of Gumball as Darwin Watterson and A Girl Named Jo as Dwight Hughes.

Early life
Ransom was born in Royal Oak, Michigan, as the son of Terrell and Katrina Ransom. Ransom showed an interest in acting and modeling very early on from watching the Disney series Hannah Montana as a child. He then enrolled in acting classes where teachers were reluctant to work with him because of his young age. Katrina later relocated to California to facilitate her son's career.

Career
Since moving to California in late 2007, Ransom has been working consistently. He has appeared in numerous commercials including ads for Kmart, Quilted Northern, Old Navy, Elmers Glue, McDonald's and SpongeBob SpongeSoap. For seven years he had a recurring role on Days of Our Lives and made guest appearances on several shows including ABC's The Middle and Detroit 1-8-7, CBS's CSI:NY and NBC's The Jay Leno Show. He has also appeared in a few movies including the 2011 flick The Chicago 8 and 2012 Lifetime movie Murder on the 13th Floor. From season three to the eleventh episode of season five in Cartoon Network's The Amazing World of Gumball, Ransom provided the voice of Darwin Watterson after Kwesi Boakye (who voiced Darwin for the first three seasons) hit puberty. He was succeeded by Donielle T. Hansley Jr. for the same reason.

Filmography

References

External links
Official website

2003 births
Living people
African-American people
American male child actors
American male soap opera actors
American male television actors
American male voice actors
People from Royal Oak, Michigan